The Old Cinderella (Chinese: 脱轨时代) is a 2014 Chinese romantic comedy film directed by Wu Bai and starring Zhang Jingchu, Pan Yueming and Kenji Wu. A large portion of the film was shot in Israel.

Plot 
Xu Ke is a divorced woman in her 30s with a 5 year old son. After her divorce, she meets with rich and handsome Kang Shengxie by accident but doubts his intentions, while her ex-husband Liu Guangmang tries to rekindle the love they shared before he cheated on her. It is up to her to decide whom she will pick.

Cast
 Zhang Jingchu - Xu Ke
 Pan Yueming
 Kenji Wu
 Zhu Zhu
 Ban Jiajia

References

External links
 
 

2014 romantic comedy films
2014 films
Chinese romantic comedy films
Films shot in Israel
2010s Mandarin-language films